Édgar's Fall (La Caída de Édgar) is a video that was uploaded to YouTube on May 9, 2006 from Mexico. This internet meme has been one of the most popular videos in YouTube, with over 76 million views as of May 2022.

History 
The video clip features Mexican cousins Édgar Martinez and Fernando, hiking in a ranch near their home town of Monterrey with their uncle, Raúl, who serves as the cameraman and tour companion. It starts with Édgar expressing fear on using a makeshift bridge made from two long branches that crosses a small stream when Fernando makes a joke about pushing Édgar off the bridge into the water. Fernando assures the still-hesitant Édgar that he wouldn't fall, which temporarily consoles the latter, who then commences the crossing. Once Édgar is at the middle of the bridge, Fernando starts moving one of the branches, causing the former to curse angrily in a Mexican norteño (more specifically, northeastern) accent, saying "¡Ya wey!, ¡pinche pendejo wey!, ¡ya!" After Édgar calls Fernando an "idiota" (idiot) while begging for him to stop, Fernando drops the branch and Édgar finally loses his balance, plunging into the stream. Édgar curses more intensively as he emerges from the water, while Fernando asks for forgiveness.

Impact on Mexico's popular media 
Édgar's fall was the subject of much media exposure in Mexico, including in newspapers and on the TV news.

There are ringtones, games, parodies, remixes and even a web page where Édgar is proposed for Mexico's presidency. There are over 20 versions of the video including Star Wars,  Mario Brothers,  Street Fighter, Counter Strike, Naruto, Mortal Kombat, Fall Guys and Pokémon. Some publicity campaigns have made use of the video without concern for copyright issues, for example Nike's Joga Bonito campaign.

Édgar's Revenge 
In 2007, Édgar, Fernando and Raúl were featured in a commercial called La Venganza de Édgar (Édgar's Revenge), which was made by a Mexican cookie company, Gamesa, as part of a series of commercials for the company's Emperador (Emperor) brand of cookies. The Emperador commercials showed people acting like they were a Roman Emperor, calling their guards to turn things in their favor. 

The Edgar's Revenge commercial, which also became a viral video, re-enacts the situation seen in the original video, with the curse words Édgar uttering being beeped out. Instead of Édgar falling in the river, he screams "Guardias!" and suddenly Roman soldiers appear, to the shock of Fernando. Édgar orders the Roman guards to throw Fernando in the water by saying, "Al río, güey" and, despite Fernando's protests, they do so. At Édgar's command, Raúl is also thrown into the water. The video was made by Gamesa's ad agency in Mexico, Olabuenaga Chemistri, and was aired for a short time.

YouTube México 
In 2007, YouTube launched the Mexican version of its website, with content oriented towards Mexicans. During the launch, Édgar was present with Coyoacán Joe where he filmed a welcome video for YouTube México.

Notes

External links
Edgar's fall – The original video
Edgar's fall Star Wars – Star Wars version
Edgar's Interview – an interview with Edgar
Edgara's fall in Hechos Edgar's fall in the Mexican news
Edgar: The Emperor – Edgar's  revenge

Viral videos
2006 works
Internet memes
Internet memes introduced in 2006
2006 YouTube videos